Gormiti is a CGI animated television series co-produced by Giochi Preziosi, Planeta Junior and Kotoc Produccions, based on the toy line of the same name. Unrelated to the two prior animated series in the franchise, the show was first unveiled at MIPJunior in October 2017. It began airing in the United States, Spain, and Italy in the fall of 2018.

Broadcast
The series premiered in Spain on Boing  on September 10, 2018 and then on Clan. In Italy, the first five episodes were released through RaiPlay on September 21, 2018 ahead of its linear television debut on Rai Gulp and Rai YoYo on October 1, 2018.

In Canada, the series debuted in English on Teletoon on April 5, 2019. It later aired on the French-language Télétoon on May 10, 2019. In France, the series premiered on January 9, 2019 on Canal J, in April 2019 on Gulli Africa and on May 30 on Gulli in France. In the United Kingdom, the series began airing on CITV on September 2, 2019. In Turkey, the series began airing on Cartoon Network on March 2, 2020, and In The Middle East, the series began airing on Spacetoon on 2019.

References

External links
Official website
 

2018 Italian television series debuts
2010s Italian television series
2018 Spanish television series debuts
2010s Spanish television series
Italian children's animated action television series
Italian children's animated adventure television series
Italian children's animated comedy television series
Italian children's animated fantasy television series
Spanish children's animated action television series
Spanish children's animated adventure television series
Spanish children's animated comedy television series
Spanish children's animated fantasy television series
Italian computer-animated television series